C. Arden Pope III (born c. 1954) is an American professor of economics at Brigham Young University and one of the world's foremost experts in environmental science. He received his B.S. from Brigham Young University (BYU) in 1978 and his Ph.D. in economics and statistics from Iowa State University in 1981. Although his research includes many papers on topics in the fields in which he was trained—environmental economics, resource economics, and agricultural economics—he is better known for his cross-disciplinary work in environmental epidemiology and public health. He is world-renowned for his seminal work on the effects of particulate air pollution on mortality and health. His articles have helped establish the connection between air pollution and health problems, including cancer, cardiovascular, and pulmonary disease. These research findings have influenced environmental policy in the United States and Europe, contributing to the establishment of emission standards for particulate matter pollution.

Air pollution research

Early in Pope's career he published a paper that made him an academic cornerstone of environmental science and policy called "Respiratory hospital admissions associated with PM10 pollution in Utah, Salt Lake, and Cache Valleys". In Utah Valley, the Geneva Steel Mill generated large quantities of particulate matter, a byproduct of fossil fuel consumption. The mill was shut down temporarily in 1986-87 as U.S. Steel sold the facility to new ownership. Pope compiled hospital admissions data for the time before, during, and after the temporary closing of the mill and was the first to convincingly show the immediate health harms associated with atmospheric particulate matter. Asthma, mortality, and respiratory admissions generally were twice as high while the plant was operating than the year in which it was closed. Utah made a particularly suitable natural experiment as the various valleys included in the study trap pollution in the winter months when temperature inversions stifle the escape of pollution. His abstract states:

Pope came under political pressure and his findings provoked controversy.  Later scrutiny revealed his results were accurate.

Six Cities and American Cancer Society studies

Pope worked with Douglas Dockery of Harvard University on a 16-year scientific study of air pollution in six major cities in the United States, which published its findings in 1993. Known as the Harvard Six Cities study, it proved to be a milestone in establishing the human health effects associated with long-term exposure to fine particulate pollution, and remains one of the most highly citied studies of air pollution ever published. Like Pope's Utah Valley research, the Six Cities study proved intensely controversial. The study's conclusions were affirmed in 2000 after a three-year-long independent analysis carried out by the Health Effects Institute. They have also been supported by numerous follow-up studies.

Pope and Dockery also collaborated on a long-term study of the effects of air pollution on over half a million people from 151 urban areas, which published its first results in 1995. Informally known as the American Cancer Society study, it found that long-term exposure to particulates was linked to cardiopulmonary and lung cancer mortality.

Awards 
In 2004 Pope was awarded the Utah Governor's Medal in Science and Technology.

In 2006 Pope was recognized as BYU's distinguished faculty, receiving the Karl G. Maeser award.

See also
 Air quality in Utah

References

Sources

Bibliography

External links
 Faculty page at Brigham Young University
 CV
 Video of 2007 presentation to a local environmental group, Sevier Citizens for Clean Air and Water, in Richfield, Utah
 Evidence Review of Particulate Matter Effects

1950s births
Living people
Brigham Young University alumni
Iowa State University alumni
Brigham Young University faculty
American Latter Day Saints
21st-century American economists
American epidemiologists
Health economists